Kamachi (written: 蒲池) is a Japanese surname. Notable people with the surname include:

 (1520–1578), Japanese warrior
 (born 1936), Japanese sport shooter

Japanese-language surnames